Tehlikeli Oyunlar (Dangerous Plays) is the second novel of Oğuz Atay. It has been published in 1973. The main character of the novel is Hikmet Benol. Atay has stated in his diary that he has tried to create a "negative character" contrary to Selim Işık, who is the main character in his first novel Tutunamayanlar. The book was written in stream of consciousness. It is one of the first and most influential Turkish postmodern novels.

1973 novels
Novels by Oğuz Atay